Libre (lit. Free) was a political party in Guatemala.

History
Libre is a political party in formation, on September 18, 2016 the political party was registered by the Supreme Electoral Tribunal, and its registration process ended on December 13, 2018. It currently has 17,700 members, its general secretary is Carlos René Maldonado Alonzo. Its leader is Aníbal García, former general secretary of the New Republic Movement party and former presidential candidate in 2015, and vice president in 2011. The movement has had rapprochement with former attorney general Thelma Aldana to explore a possible coalition with Encuentro por Guatemala and Semilla for apply for Aldana to the presidency in 2019.  In September 2018, the political organization concluded the requirements and was made official as a political party in the same month.

Presidential elections

References

External links
Plan for Governing (2020-2024)

2018 establishments in Guatemala
2020 disestablishments in Guatemala
Defunct political parties in Guatemala
Political parties disestablished in 2020
Political parties established in 2018
Progressive parties
Socialist parties in Guatemala